Sir John Stuart Lilleyman 
 (born 9 July 1945) is a British paediatric haematologist. He specialization is the childhood leukemia.

In 1991, the Royal College of Pathologists awarded him its first Distinguished Service Medal for establishing the United Kingdom's system of pathology laboratory accreditation.

He greatly contributed to the testing of leukemia treatment methods and conducted the unique researches on "thiopurine metabolism" which was made on children suffered with leukemia. 

Other branch of medicine that is of great interest to him is childhood ITP, where he feels qualms about the  early treatment of this disease with the help of immunoglobulin.

He served as president of the Royal Society of Medicine from 2004 to 2006. Being the president of the Royal College of Pathologists he has also the role of vice-chairman of the Academy of the Medical Royal Colleges. In 2004, with the difference of three months he became medical director of the National Patient Safety Agency (NPSA) and the president of the Royal Society of Medicine At the moment he works as strategic advisor to the National Research Ethics Service.

References

Books
 John S. Lilleyman (1992)Paediatric Haematology. Publisher: Churchill Livingstone (1 November 1992). 
 John S. Lilleyman (1994). Childhood Leukaemia: The Facts (The Facts Series). Publisher: Oxford University Press (25 August 1994). 
 John S. Lilleyman (1999). Pediatric Hematology, 2e. Publisher: Churchill Livingstone; 2 edition (11 May 1999)

External links 

 

1945 births
Living people
Fellows of the Royal College of Physicians
Fellows of the Royal College of Physicians of Edinburgh
Fellows of the Royal College of Pathologists
Fellows of the Royal College of Paediatrics and Child Health
Fellows of the Academy of Medical Sciences (United Kingdom)
Presidents of the Royal Society of Medicine
Knights Bachelor